The League of Legends EMEA Championship (LEC) is the professional League of Legends esports league run by Riot Games in the EMEA (Europe, the Middle East and Africa) region, in which ten teams compete. Each annual season of play is divided into two splits, spring and summer, both consisting of nine weeks of round-robin tournament play, which then conclude with play-off tournaments between the top six teams. At the end of the season, the top performing teams qualify for the annual League of Legends World Championship. The LEC represents the highest level of League of Legends play in the EMEA.

With the exception of some touring events, all games of the LEC are played live at Riot Games' studio in Adlershof, Berlin, Germany. In addition to a small studio audience, all games are streamed live in several languages on Twitch and YouTube, with broadcasts regularly attracting over 300,000 viewers.

The popularity and success of the LEC has attracted significant media attention. On 30 September 2016, the French Senate unanimously adopted the last version of the Law for a Digital Republic, significantly improving the visa process for LEC players and esports athletes in general, giving a legal frame to esports contracts, introducing mechanisms to ensure payment of cash prizes, specifying rights for minor esport athletes, and more. A few months before, France also introduced a new esports federation, "France Esports", which has the duty to be a representative body of esports towards the government and serve as a "partner of the French National Olympic and Sports Committee for all matters relating to the recognition of electronic sports as sport in itself". Spain did the same in November 2016, creating the Spanish Federation of Video Games and Esports Spanish Federation of Video Games and Esports. The LEC has attracted sponsorships from Kia, Red Bull, and Erste Group.

Fnatic is the only team remaining that has played in every split since the inaugural 2013 Spring Split.

The LEC announced a controversial sponsorship deal with Neom in 2020. Many of the league's staff threatened a walkout, which led to the sponsorship being cancelled.

Previous names 
 2013–2018: European League of Legends Championship Series (EU LCS)
 2019–2022: League of Legends European Championship (LEC)
 2023–present: League of Legends EMEA Championship (LEC)

History
Riot Games launched League of Legends in October 2009 and attracted attention from the competitive gaming community. The first two seasons of competitive play consisted of a series of tournaments mostly organised by third parties, such as Intel Extreme Masters in Europe, capped by a world championship tournament hosted by Riot Games.

Riot Games announced the formation of the LCS on 6 August 2012, creating a fully professional league run by the company with a regular schedule and guaranteed salaries for players, featuring eight teams. Since the LCS was only launched in the third year of professional play, it was dubbed "Season 3". The top three finishers in the Riot Games European regional championships held in August 2012 automatically qualified, with the remaining five teams being decided in qualifier tournaments held in January 2013. Each LCS season is divided into two splits for spring and summer; the first games of the first spring split took place on 7 February 2013 in North America and on 9 February 2013 in Europe.

Season 3 of the LCS finished with the top three finishers Fnatic, Lemondogs, and Gambit Gaming. The top three teams advanced to the Season 3 World Championships.

Riot Games changed naming conventions in 2014, calling the season the "2014 Season" instead of "Season 4". The League of Legends Challenger Series was created as a second tier of competition for promotion and relegation.

At the end of the 2014 season, an expansion tournament was held in Europe that added two teams in region, giving the LCS a total of 10 teams for the start of the 2015 Season. Additionally, Riot introduced the concept of "Championship points", which teams would earn based on performance across both splits and playoffs in order to qualify for the League of Legends World Championship.

A new sale of sponsorship rule was instated for the 2015 season. As a result, several teams were forced to rebrand and leave their respective parent organisations.

The 2015 Summer European LCS Finals were played at Hovet Arena, Stockholm. The series ended with Fnatic winning 3–2 over Origen and peaked at close to 1 million concurrent viewers on Twitch, YouTube, and Azubu – the highest number of viewers for any LCS match to date.

The 2016 Spring European LCS finals were held at Rotterdam Ahoy in Rotterdam, with G2 winning 3–1 against Origen, making it their first LCS title. The 2016 Spring European LCS split was the first time G2 played in the professional LCS after having been promoted due to winning the European Challenger Series and European Promotion Tournament in Summer 2016.

The 2016 Summer European LCS finals were played at the Tauron Arena in Kraków, Poland. G2 won 3–1 against Splyce and secured their second LCS title. Splyce would later win the 2016 Summer European Gauntlet and qualify for Worlds as the third-seeded European team.

The 2017 Spring European LCS finals were held at the Barclaycard Arena in Hamburg, Germany, where G2 won 3–1 against Unicorns of Love, securing their third LCS title and qualifying for the Mid-Season Invitational (MSI), an annually-held international League of Legends competition. G2 placed second at the MSI 2017, losing 1–3 to SKT T1, the Korean representatives, in the finals. The Summer Split LCS finals took place in Paris at the AccorHotel Arena, where G2 Esports won 3–0 against Misfits Gaming.

In 2019 the league rebranded from the "Europe League Championship Series" (EU LCS) to the "League of Legends European Championship" (LEC) and began franchising. Following the example of North America's LCS, which franchised a year prior, the LEC selected ten permanent franchise partners, replacing the previous promotion and relegation format. The EU LCS' secondary league, the EU Challenger Series (EUCS), was consequently discontinued and replaced with an independent tournament named European Masters, which features the top teams from Europe's many regional leagues.

In 2020, the league announced via their public Twitter account a partnership with Saudi Arabian city, Neom. Following major community backlash, the partnership was called off the next day. Another two days later, the league's Director of Esports EMEA, Alberto Guerrero, put out a statement apologizing to the community for the partnership decision, with emphasis on apologizing to 'women, LGBTQIA+ individuals, and League of Legends players in the Middle East'.

Since 2023, Turkey, CIS and MENA have merged with Europe region to become a EMEA (Europe, the Middle East and Africa) region. The "League of Legends European Championship" become the "League of Legends EMEA Championship",  meaning teams from Turkey and CIS's leagues (TCL, LCL) will no longer get direct slots for the Mid-Season Invitational and the World Championship. TCL will be a qualification of Tier-2 league EMEA Masters.

Current format
Since the rebrand of the league in 2023, 10 teams, selected through franchising, compete in the LEC. Each season is divided into three splits. The regular season of each split consists of 3 weeks of play, in which each team plays each other once in a single round-robin format, for a total of 9 games each. The top 8 teams proceed to a double-elimination group stage, from which the top 2 teams of each group compete in a four-team double elimination playoff bracket. Each split's playoffs award cash prizes and Championship Points, which are used to determine seeding for the season finals. 

The three split champions, plus additional teams based on Championship Points, compete in the season finals. The season finals is a double elimination bracket, with the top 4 seeds qualifying for the upper bracket.

Overview (2023)

Stage 1 
 10 teams
 Single round-robin, best of one
 Top 8 teams advance to Stage 2

Stage 2 

 8 teams, divided into 2 groups of 4 teams
 Double elimination, best of three
 Top 2 teams of each group advance to Stage 3
Stage 3

 4 teams
 Double elimination, best of five

The winners of the winter and spring splits qualify for the Mid-Season Invitational. The top four teams of the season finals qualify for the World Championship.

Teams

Media coverage 
The LEC primarily reaches its viewers through online streaming using its own channels on Twitch and YouTube. On Twitch alone, viewership numbers regularly exceed 200,000 for regular season play, and the games have drawn over 1.7 million unique visitors. In Spring 2020, the LEC reached an average minute audience of over 220,000. with the Spring Finals peaking at over 817,000 consecutive viewers. However, Riot Games CEO Brandon Beck stated in 2012 that there were no immediate plans to try to bring the LCS to traditional TV, but news coverage of the regular season isn't generally limited to dedicated electronic sports news sites, such as CBS Interactive's onGamers.

The scale and popularity of the LEC itself, however, has attracted considerable media attention, particularly around some events that legitimised the LEC as a serious competition.

Broadcast team

Results

Number of top four finishes 
<onlyinclude> Denotes a team that no longer participates in the league.

Notes

References

External links 
 Official 2021 Season LEC Rulebook

League of Legends competitions
Recurring sporting events established in 2013
Sports competitions in Berlin
Sports competitions in Germany